Magnapinna atlantica, previously known as "Magnapinna sp. A", is a species of bigfin squid known from only two specimens collected in the northern Atlantic Ocean. It is characterised by several unique morphological features: the tentacle bases are narrower than adjacent arm bases, the proximal tentacle lacks suckers but possesses glandular structures, and the animal's pigment is contained mostly in functional chromatophores.

M. atlantica was described in 2006 by Michael Vecchione and Richard E. Young. The holotype, deposited in the National Museum of Natural History (cat. no. This specimen is relatively intact with damage only to the tips of the arms and tentacles. The paratype, held in the Natural History Museum (cat. no.

References

Bibliography
Vecchione, M.; Young, R. E.; Guerra, A.; Lindsay, D. J.; Clague, D. A.; Bernhard, J. M.; Sager, W. W.; Gonzalez, A. F.;  Rocha F. J. & Segonzac M. (2001). "Worldwide observations of remarkable deep-sea squids". Science 294: 2505-2506.
Vecchione, M. & Young, R. E. (2006). "The squid family Magnapinnidae (Mollusca; Cephalopoda) in the North Atlantic with a description of Magnapinna atlantica, n. sp.". Proc. Biol. Soc. Wash. 119(3): 365-372.

External links
Tree of Life web project: Magnapinna atlantica
Magnapinna atlantica: Description continued
Magnapinna atlantica: Description of paratype

Squid
Molluscs described in 2006